Hello Mini is a romantic-thriller web series about a young girl Mini and her stalker, who is both a blessing and a curse. Directed by Faruk Kabir, the series is an adaptation of novels written by Novoneel Chakraborty and Croctales. The web show features Anuja Joshi who plays the titular character Mini. The series is available for streaming on MX Player and the Season 1 was aired on 1 October 2019. The show's second season streamed on 26 February 2021 followed immediately by third season in May 2021.

Plot 
Young 22-year-old Rivanah shifts to Mumbai from Kolkata and notices that someone is following and blackmailing her. This someone is voiceless, faceless, nameless and is forcing her to "know her worth". Even though he is stalking her and making her miserable, she is drawn to the Stranger and soon realizes that he is actually helping her. But everything comes at a cost, as the stranger's obsession with her and eventually hers with him leads her down a dangerous path, affecting her life and the lives of all those around her.

Cast and characters

Release 
The official trailer of the web series was launched on 26 September 2019, by MX Player on YouTube and the show was available for free streaming on MX Player from 1 October 2019. For the second season, trailer was released on 17 February 2021 and the series was released on 26 February 2021 on MX Player.

Awards 
Won at E4m Play Awards 2020 - Best Thriller / Horror Show on Web - Bronze

References

External links
 

2019 Indian television series debuts
MX Player original programming
Hindi-language web series
Indian web series
2019 Indian television seasons
2021 Indian television seasons